The Meadows Schoolhouse is a two-story schoolhouse building located in New Meadows, Idaho which was listed on the National Register of Historic Places in 1979.  It has a tin roof, like many other buildings in the area do, for shedding snow.

It was deemed significant as a "fine example of classical eclectic schoolhouse architecture of the early twentieth century, handsomely executed in brick and very well-preserved. It is the most substantial surviving building in Meadows, a town which was left behind when the railroad passed by a few miles to the west."

See also

 List of National Historic Landmarks in Idaho
 National Register of Historic Places listings in Adams County, Idaho

References

1912 establishments in Idaho
Buildings and structures in Adams County, Idaho
School buildings completed in 1912
School buildings on the National Register of Historic Places in Idaho
National Register of Historic Places in Adams County, Idaho